The 2010–11 New York Islanders season was the 39th season in franchise history.

The Islanders posted a regular season record of 30 wins, 39 losses and 13 overtime/shootout losses for 73 points, failing to qualify for the Stanley Cup playoffs for the fourth consecutive season.

Off-season
The Islanders selected forward Nino Niederreiter with the fifth overall pick in the 2010 NHL Entry Draft. Niederreiter became the highest-drafted Swiss-born player in NHL history.

Throughout the off-season, the Islanders added defensemen Milan Jurcina, Mark Eaton and Mike Mottau, as well as forwards Zenon Konopka and P. A. Parenteau via free agency.

In a July 30, 2010, trade with the Anaheim Ducks, the Islanders acquired defenseman James Wisniewski in exchange for a conditional third-round draft pick in 2011.

Most notably, the Islanders lost forward Kyle Okposo and defenseman Mark Streit to two accidental and separate shoulder injuries during training camp, both requiring surgeries. These injuries effectively removed two top-line players for the Islanders, as they were expected to remain out for three and six months, respectively.

Meanwhile, arena issues continued to follow the franchise, as team owner Charles Wang's proposed Lighthouse Project was met with continued obstacles from local authorities. Both sides remain at odds, and little progress has been made since.

Regular season
After a ten-game losing streak, the Islanders changed coaches on November 15, 2010, moving Scott Gordon into an adviser to the general manager position and naming the Bridgeport Sound Tigers' head coach, Jack Capuano, as their interim head coach.
The Islanders ended a near franchise-tying record of 15-straight games without a win on November 26, 2010, against the New Jersey Devils. The Islanders won 2–0 with Rick DiPietro securing the shutout. The Islanders ended the season with the worst average attendance in the NHL with an average of 11,059 (68.1% arena capacity).

The Islanders finished the regular season having scored the most shorthanded goals, with 15.

Playoffs
On March 26, 2011, the Islanders were mathematically eliminated when the Buffalo Sabres defeated the New Jersey Devils. The Islanders last made the playoffs in the 2006–07 season.

Standings

Divisional standings

Conference standings

Schedule and results

Pre-season

|- style="text-align:center; background:#fcc;"
| 1 || September 29 (in Saskatoon, SK) || Calgary Flames || 3 - 2 || New York Islanders (SS) || || DiPietro || 0-1-0 || 
|- style="text-align:center; background:#fcc;"
| 2 || September 29 || New York Islanders || 1 - 3 || Philadelphia Flyers || || Roloson || 0-2-0 || 
|- style="text-align:center; background:#fcc;"
| 3 || October 1 || New York Islanders || 3 - 4 || New Jersey Devils || || Roloson || 0-3-0 || 
|- style="text-align:center; background:#cfc;"
| 4 || October 2 || New Jersey Devils || 1 - 2 || New York Islanders (SS) || || DiPietro || 1-3-0 || 
|- style="text-align:center; background:#fcc;"
| 5 || October 2 (in Quebec City, QC) || Montreal Canadiens || 7 - 2 || New York Islanders (SS) || || Legace || 1-4-0 || 
|- style="text-align:center;"
| colspan=11| (SS) = Split-squad games.
|-

Regular season

|- style="text-align:center; background:white;"
| 1 || 9 || Dallas Stars || 4-5 (SO) || Nassau Veterans Memorial Coliseum (13,351) || 0-0-1 || 1
|- style="text-align:center; background:#cfc;"
| 2 || 11 || New York Rangers || 6-4 || Nassau Veterans Memorial Coliseum (11,748) || 1-0-1 || 3
|- style="text-align:center; background:#fcc;"
| 3 || 13 || @ Washington Capitals || 1-2 || Verizon Center (18,398) || 1-1-1 || 3
|- style="text-align:center; background:white;"
| 4 || 15 || @ Pittsburgh Penguins || 2-3 (OT) || Consol Energy Center (18,195) || 1-1-2 || 4
|- style="text-align:center; background:#cfc;"
| 5 || 16 || Colorado Avalanche || 5-2 || Nassau Veterans Memorial Coliseum (10,127) || 2-1-2 || 6
|- style="text-align:center; background:#cfc;"
| 6 || 18 || @ Toronto Maple Leafs || 2-1 (OT) || Air Canada Centre (19,086) || 3-1-2 || 8
|- style="text-align:center; background:#cfc;"
| 7 || 21 || @ Tampa Bay Lightning || 3-2 (OT) || St. Pete Times Forum (13,333) || 4-1-2 || 10
|- style="text-align:center; background:#fcc;"
| 8 || 23 || @ Florida Panthers || 3-4 || BankAtlantic Center (15,071) || 4-2-2 || 10
|- style="text-align:center; background:#fcc;"
| 9 || 27 || @ Montreal Canadiens || 3-5 || Bell Centre (21,273) || 4-3-2 || 10
|- style="text-align:center; background:#fcc;"
| 10 || 29 || Montreal Canadiens || 1-3 || Nassau Veterans Memorial Coliseum (11,922) || 4-4-2 || 10
|- style="text-align:center; background:#fcc;"
| 11 || 30 || @ Philadelphia Flyers || 1-6 || Wachovia Center (19,613) || 4-5-2 || 10
|-

|- style="text-align:center; background:#fcc;"
| 12 || 3 || @ Carolina Hurricanes || 2-7 || RBC Center (13,043) || 4-6-2 || 10
|- style="text-align:center; background:#fcc;"
| 13 || 4 || @ Ottawa Senators || 1-4 || Scotiabank Place (17,752) || 4-7-2 || 10
|- style="text-align:center; background:#fcc;"
| 14 || 6 || Philadelphia Flyers || 1-2 || Nassau Veterans Memorial Coliseum (13,078) || 4-8-2 || 10
|- style="text-align:center; background:#fcc;"
| 15 || 10 || @ Anaheim Ducks || 0-1 || Honda Center (14,393) || 4-9-2 || 10
|- style="text-align:center; background:white;"
| 16 || 11 || @ San Jose Sharks || 1-2 (SO) || HP Pavilion (17,562) || 4-9-3 || 11
|- style="text-align:center; background:#fcc;"
| 17 || 13 || @ Los Angeles Kings || 1-5 || Staples Center (18,118) || 4-10-3 || 11
|- style="text-align:center; background:#fcc;"
| 18 || 17 || Tampa Bay Lightning || 2-4 || Nassau Veterans Memorial Coliseum (8,025) || 4-11-3 || 11
|- style="text-align:center; background:#fcc;"
| 19 || 20 || Florida Panthers || 1-4 || Nassau Veterans Memorial Coliseum (9,157) || 4-12-3 || 11
|- style="text-align:center;" bgcolor=""
| 20 || 21 || @ Atlanta Thrashers || 1-2 (OT) || Philips Arena (10,066) || 4-12-4 || 12
|- style="text-align:center;" bgcolor=""
| 21 || 24 || Columbus Blue Jackets || 3-4 (OT) || Nassau Veterans Memorial Coliseum (8,652) || 4-12-5 || 13
|- style="text-align:center; background:#cfc;"
| 22 || 26 || New Jersey Devils || 2-0 || Nassau Veterans Memorial Coliseum (10,897) || 5-12-5 || 15
|-

|- style="text-align:center; background:#fcc;"
| 23 || 2 || New York Rangers || 5-6 || Nassau Veterans Memorial Coliseum (13,742) || 5-13-5 || 15
|- style="text-align:center; background:#fcc;"
| 24 || 3 || @ New York Rangers || 0-2 || Madison Square Garden (18,200) || 5-14-5 || 15
|- style="text-align:center; background:#fcc;"
| 25 || 5 || Philadelphia Flyers || 2-3 || Nassau Veterans Memorial Coliseum (7,773) || 5-15-5 || 15
|- style="text-align:center; background:#fcc;"
| 26 || 9 || @ Boston Bruins || 2-5 || TD Garden (17,565) || 5-16-5 || 15
|- style="text-align:center; background:#fcc;"
| 27 || 11 || Atlanta Thrashers || 4-5 || Nassau Veterans Memorial Coliseum (10,056) || 5-17-5 || 15
|- style="text-align:center; background:#fcc;"
| 28 || 13 || @ Nashville Predators || 0-5 || Bridgestone Arena (14,314) || 5-18-5 || 15
|- style="text-align:center; background:#cfc;"
| 29 || 16 || Anaheim Ducks || 3-2 || Nassau Veterans Memorial Coliseum (7,659) || 6-18-5 || 17
|- style="text-align:center;" bgcolor=""
| 30 || 18 || Phoenix Coyotes || 3-4 (SO) || Nassau Veterans Memorial Coliseum (8,433) || 6-18-6 || 18
|- style="text-align:center; background:#cfc;"
| 31 || 22 || Tampa Bay Lightning || 2-1 (OT) || Nassau Veterans Memorial Coliseum (7,324) || 7-18-6 || 20
|- style="text-align:center; background:#cfc;"
| 32 || 23 || @ New Jersey Devils || 5-1 || Prudential Center (13,312) || 8-18-6 || 22
|- style="text-align:center; background:#cfc;"
| 33 || 26 || Montreal Canadiens || 4-1 || Nassau Veterans Memorial Coliseum (3,136) || 9-18-6 || 24
|- style="text-align:center; background:#fcc;"
| 34 || 27 || @ New York Rangers || 2-7 || Madison Square Garden (18,200) || 9-19-6 || 24
|- style="text-align:center; background:#cfc;"
| 35 || 29 || Pittsburgh Penguins || 2-1 (SO) || Nassau Veterans Memorial Coliseum (14,345) || 10-19-6 || 26
|- style="text-align:center; background:#cfc;"
| 36 || 31 || @ Detroit Red Wings || 4-3 (OT) || Joe Louis Arena (20,066) || 11-19-6 || 28
|-

|- style="text-align:center; background:#cfc;"
| 37 || 3 || @ Calgary Flames || 5-2 || Scotiabank Saddledome (19,289) || 12-19-6 || 30
|- style="text-align:center; background:#fcc;"
| 38 || 6 || @ Edmonton Oilers || 1-2 || Rexall Place (16,839) || 12-20-6 || 30
|- style="text-align:center; background:#cfc;"
| 39 || 8 || @ Colorado Avalanche || 4-3 (OT) || Pepsi Center (15,171) || 13-20-6 || 32
|- style="text-align:center; background:#fcc;"
| 40 || 9 || @ Chicago Blackhawks || 0-5 || United Center (21,205) || 13-21-6 || 32
|- style="text-align:center;" bgcolor=""
| 41 || 11 || Vancouver Canucks || 3-4 (SO) || Nassau Veterans Memorial Coliseum (8,913) || 13-21-7 || 33
|- style="text-align:center; background:#fcc;"
| 42 || 13 || Ottawa Senators || 4-6 || Nassau Veterans Memorial Coliseum (8,670) || 13-22-7 || 33
|- style="text-align:center; background:#cfc;"
| 43 || 15 || Buffalo Sabres || 5-3 || Nassau Veterans Memorial Coliseum (12,223) || 14-22-7 || 35
|- style="text-align:center; background:#fcc;"
| 44 || 17 || New Jersey Devils || 2-5 || Nassau Veterans Memorial Coliseum (13,119) || 14-23-7 || 35
|- style="text-align:center; background:#fcc;"
| 45 || 20 || Washington Capitals || 1-2 || Nassau Veterans Memorial Coliseum (9,119) || 14-24-7 || 35
|- style="text-align:center; background:#cfc;"
| 46 || 21 || @ Buffalo Sabres || 5-2 || HSBC Arena (18,690) || 15-24-7 || 37
|- style="text-align:center; background:#fcc;"
| 47 || 23 || Buffalo Sabres || 3-5 || Nassau Veterans Memorial Coliseum (10,120) || 15-25-7 || 37
|- style="text-align:center; background:#fcc;"
| 48 || 25 || @ Pittsburgh Penguins || 0-1 || Consol Energy Center (18,225) || 15-26-7 || 37
|- style="text-align:center; background:#fcc;"
| 49 || 26 || Carolina Hurricanes || 2-4 || Nassau Veterans Memorial Coliseum (4,976) || 15-27-7 || 37
|-

|- style="text-align:center; background:#cfc;"
| 50 || 1 || @ Atlanta Thrashers || 4-1 || Philips Arena (11,176) || 16-27-7 || 39
|- style="text-align:center; background:#fcc;"
| 51 || 2 || @ Pittsburgh Penguins || 0-3 || Consol Energy Center (18,142) || 16-28-7 || 39
|- style="text-align:center; background:#cfc;"
| 52 || 5 || Ottawa Senators || 5-3 || Nassau Veterans Memorial Coliseum (10,415) || 17-28-7 || 41
|- style="text-align:center; background:#fcc;"
| 53 || 8 || Toronto Maple Leafs || 3-5 || Nassau Veterans Memorial Coliseum (7,249) || 17-29-7 || 41
|- style="text-align:center; background:#cfc;"
| 54 || 10 || @ Montreal Canadiens || 4-3 (SO) || Bell Centre (21,273) || 18-29-7 || 43
|- style="text-align:center; background:#cfc;"
| 55 || 11 || Pittsburgh Penguins || 9-3 || Nassau Veterans Memorial Coliseum (12,888) || 19-29-7 || 45
|- style="text-align:center; background:#cfc;"
| 56 || 13 || @ Buffalo Sabres || 7-6 (OT) || HSBC Arena (18,690) || 20-29-7 || 47
|- style="text-align:center; background:#cfc;"
| 57 || 15 || @ Ottawa Senators || 4-3 (SO) || Scotiabank Place (17,565) || 21-29-7 || 49
|- style="text-align:center; background:#fcc;"
| 58 || 17 || Boston Bruins || 3-6 || Nassau Veterans Memorial Coliseum (12,478) || 21-30-7 || 49
|- style="text-align:center; background:#cfc;"
| 59 || 19 || Los Angeles Kings || 3-0 || Nassau Veterans Memorial Coliseum (13,119) || 22-30-7 || 51
|- style="text-align:center; background:#cfc;"
| 60 || 21 || Florida Panthers || 5-1 || Nassau Veterans Memorial Coliseum (13,729) || 23-30-7 || 53
|- style="text-align:center; background:#fcc;"
| 61 || 22 || @ Toronto Maple Leafs || 1-2 || Air Canada Centre (19,459) || 23-31-7 || 53
|- style="text-align:center;" bgcolor=""
| 62 || 24 || @ Philadelphia Flyers || 3-4 (OT) || Wachovia Center (19,776) || 23-31-8 || 54
|- style="text-align:center; background:#fcc;"
| 63 || 26 || Washington Capitals || 2-3 || Nassau Veterans Memorial Coliseum (16,250) || 23-32-8 || 54
|-

|- style="text-align:center;" bgcolor=""
| 64 || 1 || @ Washington Capitals || 1-2 (OT) || Verizon Center (18,398) || 23-32-9 || 55
|- style="text-align:center; background:#cfc;"
| 65 || 2 || Minnesota Wild || 4-1 || Nassau Veterans Memorial Coliseum (7,098) || 24-32-9 || 57
|- style="text-align:center; background:#cfc;"
| 66 || 5 || St. Louis Blues || 5-2 || Nassau Veterans Memorial Coliseum (10,354) || 25-32-9 || 59
|- style="text-align:center;" bgcolor=""
| 67 || 6 || New Jersey Devils || 2-3 (SO) || Nassau Veterans Memorial Coliseum (15,893) || 25-32-10 || 60
|- style="text-align:center; background:#cfc;"
| 68 || 8 || Toronto Maple Leafs || 4-3 (OT) || Nassau Veterans Memorial Coliseum (9,217) || 26-32-10 || 62
|- style="text-align:center; background:#cfc;"
| 69 || 11 || Boston Bruins || 4-2 || Nassau Veterans Memorial Coliseum (12,119) || 27-32-10 || 64
|- style="text-align:center;" bgcolor=""
| 70 || 12 || @ New Jersey Devils || 2-3 (OT) || Prudential Center (17,625) || 27-32-11 || 65
|- style="text-align:center; background:#fcc;"
| 71 || 15 || @ New York Rangers || 3-6 || Madison Square Garden (18,200) || 27-33-11 || 65
|- style="text-align:center;" bgcolor=""
| 72 || 18 || @ Carolina Hurricanes || 2-3 (SO) || RBC Center (17,686) || 27-33-12 || 66
|- style="text-align:center; background:#cfc;"
| 73 || 19 || @ Florida Panthers || 4-3 (SO) || BankAtlantic Center (16,502) || 28-33-12 || 68
|- style="text-align:center; background:#cfc;"
| 74 || 22 || @ Tampa Bay Lightning || 5-2 || St. Pete Times Forum (17,400) || 29-33-12 || 70
|- style="text-align:center; background:#fcc;"
| 75 || 24 || Atlanta Thrashers || 1-2 || Nassau Veterans Memorial Coliseum (11,874) || 29-34-12 || 70
|- style="text-align:center; background:#fcc;"
| 76 || 26 || Philadelphia Flyers || 1-4 || Nassau Veterans Memorial Coliseum (15,458) || 29-35-12 || 70
|- style="text-align:center; background:#fcc;"
| 77 || 30 || @ New Jersey Devils || 2-3 || Prudential Center (16,252) || 29-36-12 || 70
|- style="text-align:center; background:#cfc;"
| 78 || 31 || New York Rangers || 6-2 || Nassau Veterans Memorial Coliseum (16,250) || 30-36-12 || 72
|-

|- style="text-align:center; background:#fcc;"
| 79 || 2 || Carolina Hurricanes || 2-4 || Nassau Veterans Memorial Coliseum (16,250) || 30-37-12 || 72
|- style="text-align:center; background:#fcc;"
| 80 || 6 || @ Boston Bruins || 2-3 || TD Garden (17,565) || 30-38-12 || 72
|- style="text-align:center;" bgcolor=""
| 81 || 8 || Pittsburgh Penguins || 3-4 (SO) || Nassau Veterans Memorial Coliseum (16,250) || 30-38-13 || 73
|- style="text-align:center; background:#fcc;"
| 82 || 9 || @ Philadelphia Flyers || 4-7 || Wachovia Center (19,909) || 30-39-13 || 73
|-

Player statistics

Skaters
Note: GP = Games played; G = Goals; A = Assists; Pts = Points; +/− = Plus/minus; PIM = Penalty minutes

Goaltenders
Note: GP = Games played; TOI = Time on ice (minutes); W = Wins; L = Losses; OT = Overtime losses; GA = Goals against; GAA= Goals against average; SA= Shots against; SV= Saves; Sv% = Save percentage; SO= Shutouts

†Denotes player spent time with another team before joining Islanders. Stats reflect time with Islanders only.
‡Traded mid-season. Stats reflect time with Islanders only.

Awards and records

Awards

Records

Milestones

Transactions
The Islanders have been involved in the following transactions during the 2010–11 season.

Trades

|}

Free agents acquired

Free agents lost

Claimed via waivers

Lost via waivers

Players signings

Draft picks

Farm teams

Bridgeport Sound Tigers
The Islanders' American Hockey League affiliate will remain to be the Bridgeport Sound Tigers in the 2010–11 season.

Kalamazoo Wings
On July 27, 2010, the Islanders signed an affiliation agreement with the Kalamazoo Wings of the ECHL for the 2010–11 season.

Odessa Jackalopes
The Odessa Jackalopes remain New York's Central Hockey League affiliate for the 2010–11 season.

Louisiana IceGators
On October 18, 2010, the Islanders signed an affiliation agreement with the Louisiana IceGators of the SPHL for the 2010–11 season.

References

External links
 2010–11 New York Islanders season at ESPN
 2010–11 New York Islanders season at Hockey Reference

New York Islanders seasons
New York Islanders
New York Islanders
New York Islanders
New York Islanders